Abhijit Vasant Kale  (born 4 July 1973) is a former Indian cricketer. He was a right-handed batsman and a right-arm offbreak bowler who played 1 ODI match without ever appearing in Tests.

Career
Kale began his career in 1992 for the Indian Under-19s against New Zealand. But in first class cricket, he could not find a regular place in the Bombay cricket team and hence moved to Maharashtra cricket team, for which he played during the mid-nineties and averaged nearly 60 runs per innings.

He played his only ODI match against Bangladesh at Dhaka in the TVS Cup in 2003.

In 2009 playing for Linden Park CC (an illustrious English club, with a rich history), Kale hit 39 runs – including six sixes in a row – off a single over in Kent, England. His achievement was helped by the fact that there were nine deliveries in the over, including three no balls. Kale scored a single off bowler Damion Grosscel's first ball, which was then matched by batting partner Michael Chodster Brown. Then came a two by Abhijit – followed by six consecutive sixes.

References

External links
 

1973 births
Indian cricketers
India One Day International cricketers
Living people
Maharashtra cricketers
West Zone cricketers
Tripura cricketers
People from Ahmednagar